Stigmatophora micans is a moth in the subfamily Arctiinae. It was described by Otto Vasilievich Bremer and William Grey in 1852. It is found in north-eastern Kazakhstan, Russia (southern Siberia to southern Jakutia, Amur, Primorye), Mongolia, China (Heilongjiang, Liaonin, Hebei, Henan, Shanxi, Shaanxi, Jiangsu, Gansu, Sichuan) and Korea.

References

Arctiidae genus list at Butterflies and Moths of the World of the Natural History Museum

Moths described in 1852
Lithosiini
Moths of Asia